The Trent Navigation Company existed from 1783 to 1940. It was responsible for control of navigation on the River Trent in England.

History

The Trent Navigation Company was established by Trent Navigation Act 1783 'An Act for improving the Navigation of the River Trent'. It was responsible for improving and maintaining the navigation on the river between Wilden Ferry (near Cavendish Bridge) and Gainsborough (with the exception of Averham to South Muskham), and junctions with the various other canals. The first business tackled by the Company was the building of towpaths.

Some of the canals opening in the 1790s offered routes for traffic by-passing large sections of the River Trent. By 1796 the Derby Canal connected directly to the Erewash Canal at Sandiacre and the River Trent at Swarkestone. The Nottingham Canal ran from the Erewash Canal junction at Langley Mill, which itself linked to the Cromford Canal, down to the River Trent near Trent Bridge in Nottingham. Coal from Derbyshire could be transported to Nottingham and Derby without using the river.

The competition prompted the company to implement canals cuts of their own. The Sawley cut, the Cranfleet cut and the Beeston canal provided easier navigation avoiding difficult and shallow sections of the river.

In a minor hiccup in its history, an Act of Parliament of 1887 caused the company to be taken over by the Trent (Burton-upon-Trent and Humber) Navigation Company. The Trent Navigation Act of 1892 restored the original company name.

In 1906 the Trent Navigation Company obtained an Act of Parliament authorising improvements upstream of Newark. However, only one lock at Cromwell was constructed before the outbreak of the First World War. By the Nottingham Corporation (Trent Navigation Transfer) Act of 1915, the river from Averham to Nottingham was put under the control of Nottingham Corporation. They implemented improvements to a value of £450,000 (equivalent to £ in ),which included a new locks and a cut at Holme Lock. The works completed by 1927 enabled larger river boats to sail up to Nottingham from Hull and the continent.

In 1937, the bulk of the Nottingham Canal was closed with the exception of the stretch through Nottingham, from Trent Bridge to the junction with the Beeston Canal at Lenton. This was taken over by the Trent Navigation Company.

The Trent Navigation Company ceased to exist in 1940, when it was taken over by the Trent River Catchment Board. The Catchment Board was replaced by the Trent River Board in 1951 and by the Trent River Authority in 1965.

Statistics

Annual tonnage carried for the years 1913 to 1926 inclusive 29,062 tons.

1928 – 66,960 tons
1929 – 83,118 tons
1930 – 105,337 tons
1931 – 159,315 tons
1932 – 284,666 tons
1933 – 230,609 tons
1934 – 242,853 tons
1935 – 222,538 tons
1936 – 230,514 tons
1937 – 259,321 tons
1938 – 275,030 tons

The annual tonnage carried increased more than eight-fold following the Nottingham Corporation assumption of control of part of the Trent Navigation.

Freight transport

In the late 1930s, the powerful motor vessels and dumb barges owned by the company had a total carrying capacity of 4,500 tons. Each day, vessels were in attendance at each of the Hull docks and consignments of five tons and upwards were collected direct overside from steamers. Under an ancient charter, the port of Hull is free to river and canal craft. No wharfage or landing charges were incurred when cargo was directly discharged into the company's boats.

A train of the company's barges could reach Gainsborough within five hours from Hull, and Newark-on-Trent within twelve hours. The journey from Hull to Nottingham took eighteen hours.

A typical train consisted of a mechanically propelled barge carrying 60 tons, towing three dumb barges each of which had 120 tons of goods. The largest trains of barges could carry 600 tons of cargo.

References

River Trent
River navigations in the United Kingdom
Transport companies established in 1783
Transport companies disestablished in 1940
1783 establishments in England
1940 disestablishments in England
British companies disestablished in 1940
British companies established in 1783